Jing Xiang (born 23 December 1989) is a Chinese professional boxer who has held the WBO International mini-flyweight title since 2019.

Professional career
Xiang made his professional debut on 3 December 2010, scoring a ten-round majority decision (MD) victory over Elmar Francisco at the Tianjin Sports Arena in Tianjin, China, capturing the vacant WBO Youth junior-bantamweight title.

After losing his next fight in August 2011 by unanimous decision (UD) against future world champion Jerwin Ancajas, he scored two UD wins against Anintachai Somnuek in November 2011 and June 2012. After his rematch with Somnuek he suffered the second defeat of his career against Ippei Aoki the following September, before facing Morakot CP Freshmart for the WBC Youth flyweight title. The bout took place on 12 March 2013 at the Big C Shopping Center in Bangkok, Thailand. Xiang suffered his second consecutive defeat and the third of his career, losing by UD. One judge scored the bout 97–93 while the other two scored it 96–94.

He bounced back from defeat with four wins, one by knockout (KO), before fighting to a majority draw against Yukiya Hanabusa in April 2014. In his next fight he fought to a split draw against Ben Mananquil on 25 July at the Central South University of Forestry and Technology in Changsha, China, with the vacant WBO Asia Pacific flyweight title on the line. Xiang fought Mananquil in an immediate rematch on 27 December in Haikou, China, defeating Mananquil via split decision (SD) to capture the vacant WBO Asia Pacific title. Xiang lost the title in his first defence, suffering a third-round technical knockout (TKO) defeat to Macrea Gandionco on 8 May 2015.

Following his fourth defeat, he faced Joel Taduran on 24 June 2016 at the Guangxi Sports Center Gymnasium in Nanning, China. Xiang defeated Taduran by UD to capture the vacant WBO Oriental interim flyweight title, with the judges' scorecards reading 99–91, 98–92 and 97–93. After being elevated to full WBO Oriental champion, Xiang made his first defence against Joy Joy Formentera, successfully retaining his title via UD on 10 December 2016 at the Hangzhou Stadium in Hangzhou, China. Two judges scored the bout 98–92 while the third scored it 97–93.

After three more wins in non-title fights, two by stoppage, he moved down in weight to defeat Dexter Alimento on 20 January 2018 at the Shenzhen Bao'an District Sports Center in Shenzhen, China, capturing the vacant WBO Inter-Continental light-flyweight title via UD.

In his next fight he defeated Merlito Sabillo on 15 September 2018 at the Qinzhou Sports Center Gymnasium in Qinzhou, China, capturing the vacant WBC Silver light-flyweight title by UD. He retained the title in his next fight by UD against former world champion Suriyan Satorn in January 2019.

After moving down in weight again, he faced Jomar Caindog for the vacant WBO International mini-flyweight title on 17 August 2019 at the Shenzhen Bao'an District Sports Center. After an accidental clash of heads in the eighth round left Caindog with a cut below his right eye, the contest was halted by the referee, with the decision going to the judges' scorecards. One judge scored the bout 79–73 and the other two scored it 77–75, all in favour of Xiang, awarding him the WBO International title via eighth-round technical decision (TD).

Professional boxing record

References

External links
 

Chinese male boxers
Sportspeople from Changsha
Mini-flyweight boxers
Light-flyweight boxers
Flyweight boxers
Super-flyweight boxers
Living people
1989 births